is a prefecture of Japan located in the Chūbu region of Honshu. Shizuoka Prefecture borders Kanagawa Prefecture to the east, Yamanashi Prefecture to the northeast, Nagano Prefecture to the north, and Aichi Prefecture to the west.

Shizuoka is the capital and Hamamatsu is the largest city in Shizuoka Prefecture, with other major cities including Fuji, Numazu, and Iwata. Shizuoka Prefecture is located on Japan's Pacific Ocean coast and features Suruga Bay formed by the Izu Peninsula, and Lake Hamana which is considered to be one of Japan's largest lakes. Mount Fuji, the tallest volcano in Japan and cultural icon of the country, is partially located in Shizuoka Prefecture on the border with Yamanashi Prefecture. Shizuoka Prefecture has a significant motoring heritage as the founding location of Honda, Suzuki, and Yamaha, and is home to the Fuji International Speedway.

History 

Shizuoka Prefecture was established from the former Tōtōmi, Suruga and Izu provinces.

The area was the home of the first Tokugawa shōgun. Tokugawa Ieyasu held the region until he conquered the lands of the Hōjō clan in the Kantō region and placed land under the stewardship of Toyotomi Hideyoshi. After becoming shōgun, Tokugawa took the land back for his family and put the area around modern-day Shizuoka city under the direct supervision of the shogunate. With the creation of Shizuoka han in 1868, it once again became the residence of the Tokugawa family.

Geography 
Shizuoka Prefecture is an elongated region following the coast of the Pacific Ocean at the Suruga Bay. In the west, the prefecture extends deep into the Japan Alps. In the east, it becomes a narrower coast bounded in the north by Mount Fuji, until it comes to the Izu Peninsula, a popular resort area pointing south into the Pacific.

 11% of the total land area of the prefecture was designated as Natural Parks, namely the Fuji-Hakone-Izu and Minami Alps National Parks; Tenryū-Okumikawa Quasi-National Park; and four Prefectural Natural Parks.

Climate
In Shizuoka prefecture, the temperature, over the course of the year, typically varies from 34°F to 87°F and is rarely below 28°F or above 93°F. The summers in Shizuoka are warm, oppressive, and mostly cloudy; the winters are very cold, windy, and mostly clear.

Disaster
On 15 March 2011, Shizuoka Prefecture was hit with a magnitude 6.2 earthquake approximately  NNE of Shizuoka City. It is said, that throughout history, Shizuoka area has experienced a large earthquake every 100 to 150 years.

Demographics

3,635,220 people live in Shizuoka Prefecture, according to the 2020 census.

Municipalities 

Since 2010, Shizuoka has consisted of 35 municipalities: 23 cities and 12 towns.

Mergers 

After the introduction of modern municipalities in 1889, Shizuoka consisted of 337 municipalities: 1 (by definition: district-independent) city and 23 districts with 31 towns and 305 villages. The Great Shōwa mergers of the 1950s reduced the total from 281 to 97 between 1953 and 1960, including 18 cities by then. The Great Heisei mergers of the 2000s combined the 74 remaining municipalities in the year 2000 into the current 35 by 2010.

List of governors of Shizuoka (since 1947)

Industry

Motorcycles 
Shizuoka-based companies are world leaders in several major industrial sectors. Honda, Yamaha, and Suzuki all have their roots in Shizuoka prefecture and are still manufacturing here. Thanks to this, Shizuoka pref. accounts for 28 % of Japanese motorcycle exports.

Musical instruments 
Yamaha and Kawai are both global piano brands. Yamaha has the largest share in the global piano market. Kawai has the second largest share. They both got their start in Shizuoka pref. in the early twentieth century.

Yamaha and Roland are major brand for electronic musical instruments. In the electronic piano world market, Yamaha has the world's largest share. Roland and Kawai have the second and third place share. Roland and Yamaha also manufacture high-quality synthesizers and drum machines for professional musicians.

In addition, various instruments such as wind instruments and guitars are manufactured in this prefecture. There are about 200 companies that manufacture musical instruments, in this prefecture.

Most of these musical instruments are especially produced in Hamamatsu City.

Transportation

Rail

JR East
Tōkaidō Line (Atami–Odawara)
Itō Line
JR Central
Tōkaidō Shinkansen
Tōkaidō Line (Atami–Toyohashi)
Gotenba Line
Minobu Line
Iida Line
Izukyū
Izuhakone Railway
Daiyūzan Line
Sunzu Line
Gakunan Railway
Shizuoka Railway
Ōigawa Railway
Enshū Railway
Tenryū Hamanako Railroad

Roads

Expressways
Tōmei Expressway
Shin-Tōmei Expressway
Chūbu-Ōdan Expressway
Izu-Jūkan Expressway
San-en Nanshin Expressway

Toll roads
Shizuoka East-West Road
Shizuoka South-North Road
West Fuji Road (not a toll road anymore as of 2012)
Fujinomiya Road
Nishi-Fuji Road

National highways

 National Route 1
 National Route 42
 National Route 52
 National Route 135
 National Route 136
 National Route 138
 National Route 139
 National Route 149
 National Route 150
 National Route 152
 National Route 246
 National Route 257
 National Route 301
 National Route 362
 National Route 414
 National Route 469
 National Route 473
 National Route 474

Airports

Shizuoka Airport

Ports
Shimizu Port
Atami Port and Shimoda Port - Mainly ferry route to Izu Island
Numazu Port

Education

Universities
National universities
Hamamatsu University School of Medicine
Shizuoka University
Graduate University for Advanced Studies (Mishima Campus, National Institute of Genetics)

Public universities
Shizuoka University of Art and Culture
University of Shizuoka

Private universities
Fuji Tokoha University
Hamamatsu University
Hamamatsu Gakuin University
Juntendo University (Mishima Campus)
Nihon University (Mishima Campus)
Seirei Christopher University
Shizuoka Eiwa Gakuin University
Shizuoka Institute of Science and Technology
Shizuoka Sangyo University
Shizuoka University of Welfare
Tokyo Women's Medical University (Daito Campus)
Tokai University (Shimizu and Numazu Campuses)
Tokoha Gakuen University

Senior high schools

Numazu Commercial High School
Shizuoka Prefectural Susono High School
Shizuoka Prefectural High School

Sports 

The sports teams listed below are based in Shizuoka.

Basketball
San-en NeoPhoenix

Motorsport
Fuji International Speedway

Rugby
Yamaha Júbilo  (Iwata)

Football
Shimizu S-Pulse  (Shimizu, Shizuoka)
Júbilo Iwata  (Iwata)
 Matches between the above two teams, both currently in the top flight of the J. League, are known as the Shizuoka Derby.
Honda F.C.  (Hamamatsu)
Azul Claro Numazu (Numazu)
Fujieda MYFC (Fujieda)

Volleyball
Toray Arrows (men's volleyball team)  (Mishima city)

Tourism

Museums
 Shizuoka Prefectural Museum of Art
 Museum of Natural and Environmental History, Shizuoka

Theme parks 
 Air Park Japan Air Self-Defense Force Hamamatsu Public Information Building)
 Shimizu Sushi Museum

Festivals and events

 Shimoda Black Ship Festival, held in May
 Shimizu Port Festival, held on August 5 to 7
 Shizuoka Festival, held in April
 Daidogei World Cup in central Shizuoka City, held in November
 Enshu Daimyo Festival in Iwata, held in April
 Numazu Festival, held in July
 Mishima Festival, held in August

Notes

References
 Nussbaum, Louis-Frédéric and Käthe Roth. (2005).  Japan encyclopedia. Cambridge: Harvard University Press. ;  OCLC 58053128

External links 

 Official Shizuoka Prefecture website
 Official Shizuoka Guide

 
Chūbu region
Prefectures of Japan